S. Sivasubramanian (1937/1938, Constanța – 14 June 2019, Ariyalur, India) was an Indian politician and former Member of the Legislative Assembly of Tamil Nadu. Sivasubramanian was elected to the Tamil Nadu legislative assembly as a Dravida Munnetra Kazhagam candidate from Andimadam constituency in 1989 election. Sivasubramanian also served as member of parliament in upper house.

References 

Dravida Munnetra Kazhagam politicians
1937 births
2019 deaths